Wil Parker (born 29 May 2002) is an Australian cricketer. He made his first-class debut on 14 February 2020, for Victoria in the 2019–20 Sheffield Shield season. He became the fourth-youngest cricketer to make their first-class debut for Victoria. His uncle, Geoff Parker, also played first-class cricket for Victoria.

In June 2020, Parker signed a professional contract with Victoria for the 2020–21 domestic season, opting to play cricket instead of Australian Rules Football. He made his Twenty20 debut on 27 December 2020, for the Hobart Hurricanes, in the 2020–21 Big Bash League season. He made his List A debut on 10 March 2021, for Victoria in the 2020–21 Marsh One-Day Cup.

References

External links
 

2002 births
Living people
Australian cricketers
Victoria cricketers
Hobart Hurricanes cricketers
Place of birth missing (living people)